Highway 28 may refer to:

Australia
 Cumberland Highway
Mountain Highway (Victoria)
 - NT

Canada
 Alberta Highway 28
 British Columbia Highway 28
 Nova Scotia Trunk 28
 Ontario Highway 28
 Saskatchewan Highway 28

China

Taiwan
 Provincial Highway 28

Czech Republic
 I/28 Highway; Czech: Silnice I/28

India
  National Highway 28 (India)

Ireland
  N28 road (Ireland)

Italy
 Autostrada A28

Japan
 Japan National Route 28
 Kobe-Awaji-Naruto Expressway

Korea

South Korea
 National Route 28
Gukjido 28

Malaysia
 Kuala Lumpur Middle Ring Road 28

New Zealand
 New Zealand State Highway 28 (Putāruru - Te Poi, Waikato Region)

United Kingdom
 British A28 (Hastings-Margate)

United States
 U.S. Route 28 (former)
 New England Interstate Route 28 (former)
 Alabama State Route 28
 Arkansas Highway 28
 California State Route 28
 County Route A28 (California)
 County Route J28 (California)
 County Route S28 (California)
 Delaware Route 28 (former)
 Georgia State Route 28
 Georgia State Route 28 (1919–1937) (former)
 Idaho State Highway 28
 Illinois Route 28 (former)
 Indiana State Road 28
 Iowa Highway 28
 K-28 (Kansas highway)
 Kentucky Route 28
 Louisiana Highway 28
 Maryland Route 28
 Massachusetts Route 28
 Massachusetts Route C28
 M-28 (Michigan highway)
 Minnesota State Highway 28
 County Road 28 (Dakota County, Minnesota)
 County Road 28 (Hennepin County, Minnesota)
 Mississippi Highway 28
 Missouri Route 28
 Montana Highway 28
 Nebraska Highway 28 (former)
 Nevada State Route 28
 New Hampshire Route 28
 New Jersey Route 28
 County Route 28 (Bergen County, New Jersey)
 County Route 28 (Monmouth County, New Jersey)
 New Mexico State Road 28
 New York State Route 28
 New York State Route 28N
 County Route 28 (Chenango County, New York)
 County Route 28 (Columbia County, New York)
 County Route 28 (Delaware County, New York)
 County Route 28 (Dutchess County, New York)
 County Route 28 (Erie County, New York)
 County Route 28 (Lewis County, New York)
 County Route 28 (Montgomery County, New York)
 County Route 28 (Ontario County, New York)
 County Route 28 (Orleans County, New York)
 County Route 28 (Rensselaer County, New York)
 County Route 28 (Rockland County, New York)
 County Route 28 (Saratoga County, New York)
 County Route 28 (Schoharie County, New York)
 County Route 28 (Schuyler County, New York)
 County Route 28 (St. Lawrence County, New York)
 County Route 28 (Steuben County, New York)
 County Route 28 (Suffolk County, New York)
 County Route 28 (Ulster County, New York)
 County Route 28 (Warren County, New York)
 County Route 28 (Washington County, New York)
 North Carolina Highway 28
 North Dakota Highway 28
 Ohio State Route 28
 Oklahoma State Highway 28
 Pennsylvania Route 28
 South Carolina Highway 28
 South Dakota Highway 28
 Tennessee State Route 28
 Texas State Highway 28 (former)
 Texas State Highway Spur 28
 Farm to Market Road 28
 Texas Park Road 28
 Utah State Route 28
 Virginia State Route 28
 Washington State Route 28
 West Virginia Route 28
 Wisconsin Highway 28
 Wyoming Highway 28
Territories
 Puerto Rico Highway 28

See also
List of highways numbered 28A
List of highways numbered 28B